Gerson Luiz Gusmão (born 8 May 1974) is a Brazilian professional football manager and former player who played as a left back.

Career
Born in Novo Hamburgo, Rio Grande do Sul, Gusmão played as a left back during his career. Known as Gerson during his playing days, he represented Pelotas, Blumenau, Novo Hamburgo (three stints), Esporte Clube Palmeirense, Santa Cruz-RS, Glória, Associação Esportiva Sapiranga, São Gabriel and Brasil de Pelotas.

In 2007, one year after retiring, Gusmão returned to Novo Hamburgo and was appointed manager of the under-17 squad. He worked with the under-19s in 2009, being later appointed Paulo Turra's assistant at the main squad; after the manager's dismissal, he acted as an interim.

Gusmão left Noia in 2011, and worked as Itamar Schülle's assistant at Chapecoense and Santo André before returning to the club in 2013. In 2014, he again followed Schülle at Caxias.

In 2015, Gusmão was also working as Schülle's assistant at Operário Ferroviário. On 20 November of that year, he was appointed manager of Novo Hamburgo for the upcoming season.

On 23 March 2016, Gusmão was named manager of Operário Ferroviário. Despite suffering relegation in the year's Campeonato Paranaense, he went on to win the Taça FPF later in the season, and also managed to achieve two consecutive promotions, both as champions.

On 20 October 2020, after more than four years in charge, Gusmão was sacked by Operário. He took over Botafogo-PB on 3 April 2021, before opting to leave the club to manage Remo on 21 June 2022.

Honours

Player
Novo Hamburgo
Campeonato Gaúcho Série A2: 2000
Copa FGF: 2005

Manager
Operário Ferroviário
Campeonato Brasileiro Série C: 2018
Campeonato Brasileiro Série D: 2017
Campeonato Paranaense Série A2: 2018
Taça FPF: 2016

References

External links

1974 births
Living people
People from Novo Hamburgo
Brazilian footballers
Association football defenders
Esporte Clube Pelotas players
Esporte Clube Novo Hamburgo players
Clube 15 de Novembro players
Futebol Clube Santa Cruz players
Grêmio Esportivo Glória players
Grêmio Esportivo Brasil players
Brazilian football managers
Campeonato Brasileiro Série B managers
Campeonato Brasileiro Série C managers
Campeonato Brasileiro Série D managers
Esporte Clube Novo Hamburgo managers
Operário Ferroviário Esporte Clube managers
Botafogo Futebol Clube (PB) managers
Clube do Remo managers
Sportspeople from Rio Grande do Sul